Storch is a surname.

Storch may also refer to:
 Fieseler Fi 156 Storch, a light German airplane used before, during and after World War II
 Criquet Storch, a Colombian 75% scale replica of the German airplane
 Slepcev Storch, a Serbian kit and ultralight aircraft, the latter a 75% scale replica of the German airplane
 Fly Synthesis Storch, an Italian ultralight aircraft
 TORCH complex (also known as STORCH), a medical acronym for a set of infections that are passed from a pregnant woman to her fetus

See also
Stork (disambiguation)
Storck (disambiguation)